The 1979 Australia rugby union tour of Argentina was a series of matches played between October and November 1979 in Argentina by Australia. The Wallabies won six matches of seven and drew the two game test series against Los Pumas, led by Hugo Porta.

It was the first tour of an Australian side in Argentina. The Australian squad captain was the Queenslander Mark Loane.

Players

Match summary 
Complete list of matches played by the Wallabies at Argentina:

 Test matches

Match details

First test

Second Test 

Notes

References

1979 rugby union tours
1979 in Australian rugby union
1979
1979 in Argentine rugby union
1979
History of rugby union matches between Argentina and Australia